Epitrimerus is a genus of small mites. The name was raised by the Austrian zoologist Alfred Nalepa in 1898.

Species

 Epitrimerus abietis
 Epitrimerus acutiformis
 Epitrimerus aegopodii
 Epitrimerus alinae
 Epitrimerus amomi
 Epitrimerus anthrisci
 Epitrimerus asperulae
 Epitrimerus bidensi
 Epitrimerus boczeki
 Epitrimerus bupleurispinosi
 Epitrimerus callicarpae
 Epitrimerus campanularius
 Epitrimerus cardui
 Epitrimerus carexis
 Epitrimerus carmonae
 Epitrimerus chaerophylli
 Epitrimerus chamaenerii
 Epitrimerus convallariae
 Epitrimerus cotini
 Epitrimerus crassus
 Epitrimerus cupressi
 Epitrimerus dimocarpi 
 Epitrimerus eriophori
 Epitrimerus eupatorii
 Epitrimerus fagi
 Epitrimerus farinosus
 Epitrimerus femoralis
 Epitrimerus filipendulae
 Epitrimerus flammulae
 Epitrimerus gemmicolus
 Epitrimerus gentianae
 Epitrimerus geranii
 Epitrimerus gibbosus
 Epitrimerus goodenowii
 Epitrimerus heraclei
 Epitrimerus hexapetalae
 Epitrimerus hieracii
 Epitrimerus hypochoerisi
 Epitrimerus insons
 Epitrimerus inulae
 Epitrimerus jaceae
 Epitrimerus knautiae
 Epitrimerus lirol
 Epitrimerus longitarsus
 Epitrimerus lythri
 Epitrimerus malimarginemtorquens
 Epitrimerus marginemtorquens
 Epitrimerus oculusinulae
 Epitrimerus perplexus
 Epitrimerus phaseoli
 Epitrimerus pinus
 Epitrimerus pratensis
 Epitrimerus protrichus
 Epitrimerus pungiscus
 Epitrimerus pyri (Nalepa)
 Epitrimerus pyrifoliae
 Epitrimerus pyrolae
 Epitrimerus ranunculi
 Epitrimerus rhyncothrix
 Epitrimerus rivalis
 Epitrimerus roivaineni
 Epitrimerus rotai
 Epitrimerus rubi
 Epitrimerus rumicis
 Epitrimerus silenesnutantis
 Epitrimerus spiraeae
 Epitrimerus steveni
 Epitrimerus subacromius
 Epitrimerus succisae
 Epitrimerus tanaceti
 Epitrimerus taxifoliae
 Epitrimerus taxodii
 Epitrimerus trilobus
 Epitrimerus umbonis
 Epitrimerus urbanus
 Epitrimerus urticae
 Epitrimerus venustus
 Epitrimerus vicinus
 Epitrimerus violarius

References

Eriophyidae
Taxa named by Alfred Nalepa